Antonino Maria Stromillo (5 June 1786, Gorga Cilento - 7 January 1858, Caltanissetta) was an Italian Roman Catholic bishop. From 1845 until his death he was the first bishop of the new Diocese of Caltanissetta.

Bishops of Caltanissetta
1786 births
1858 deaths